Vinciguerra may refer to:

Surname:
Andreas Vinciguerra (born 1981), Swedish tennis player
Decio Vinciguerra (1856–1934), Italian physician and ichthyologist 
Francesca Vinciguerra (1900–1985), Sicilian-born American biographer, translator, and fiction writer
Manlio Vinciguerra (born 1976), Italian scientist
Thomas Vinciguerra (1963-2021), American writer
Vincenzo Vinciguerra (born 1949), Italian neo-fascist
Jean Louis Vinciguerra (born 1944), French Businessman

Given name:
Vinciguerra d'Aragona, Italian noble